Maria Savitskaya-Mishina (born 22 April 1991) is a Russian racing cyclist. She competed in the team pursuit event at the 2013 UCI Track Cycling World Championships and she rode at the 2014 UCI Road World Championships.

Major results
2008
3rd  Team Pursuit, UEC European U23 Track Championships (with Oxana Kozonchuk, Evgenia Romanyuta and Victoria Kondel)
2013
1st  Team pursuit, UEC European U23 Track Championships (with Gulnaz Badykova, Alexandra Chekina and Svetlana Kashirina)
2015
2nd  Team Pursuit, UEC European Track Championships (with Gulnaz Badykova, Tamara Balabolina and Alexandra Chekina)

References

External links
 

1991 births
Living people
Russian female cyclists
Place of birth missing (living people)